Revelation Generation  (Rev Gen) was an annual Christian music festival in Frenchtown, New Jersey. The festival was first held on August 13, 2005, and was held annually held on the Saturday and Sunday of Labor Day weekend through 2010. The 2011 event was canceled, and the official website indicates the festival is on an indefinite hiatus.

Philadelphia stage 

Friday September 4

 Underoath
 Emery
 Haste the Day
 The Glorious Unseen

Saturday September 5

 Flyleaf
 The Devil Wears Prada
 Norma Jean
 August Burns Red
 Fireflight
 Before Their Eyes
 And Then There Were None

New York stage 

September 4

 MercyMe
 Jars of Clay
 Delirious?
 Matthew West

September 5

 Switchfoot
 Relient K
 BarlowGirl
 Needtobreathe
 The Fold
 Seabird

Nashville stage 

 Bethany Dillon
 Paul Colman
 Derek Webb
 Jon Foreman
 Corey Crowder

Come & Live stage 

 A Plea For Purging
 Kronicles
 Impending Doom
 The Glorious Unseen
 Mychildren Mybride
 Sleeping Giant
 The Ember Days
 I Am Alpha and Omega
 Nothing More
 Oceans In Love

Urban stage 

 Lecrae
 Group 1 Crew
 Trip Lee
 Hee-Sun Lee
 RUNAWAY
 DJYNOT?
 Carmen Michelle

Speakers and guests 

 Outcast BMX Team
 BFC Skateboard Team
 Justin Lookadoo
 Jack Redmond
 Eric Samuel Timm
 Adam Durso

References

External links 

 

Music festivals in New Jersey
Christian music festivals
Music festivals established in 2005
Religious festivals in the United States